830 Petropolitana (prov. designation:  or ) is a bright background asteroid from the outer regions of the asteroid belt. It was discovered on 25 August 1916, by Russian astronomer Grigory Neujmin at the Simeiz Observatory on the Crimean peninsula. It was named after the Russian city of Saint Petersburg.

Orbit and classification 

Petropolitana is a non-family asteroid of the main belt's background population when applying the hierarchical clustering method to its proper orbital elements. It orbits the Sun in the outer asteroid belt at a distance of 3.0–3.4 AU once every 5 years and 9 months (2,099 days; semi-major axis of 3.21 AU). Its orbit has an eccentricity of 0.06 and an inclination of 4° with respect to the ecliptic. The body's observation arc begins at Heidelberg Observatory on 3 September 1916, or nine nights after its official discovery observation at Simeiz.

Naming 

This minor planet was named by its Latin name "Petropolis", after the Russian city of Saint Petersburg. On the same night, Grigory Neujmin also discovered 829 Academia. Both asteroid were named on the occasion of the 200th anniversary of the founding of the Academy of Sciences in Staint Petersburg. The  was also mentioned in The Names of the Minor Planets by Paul Herget in 1955.

Physical characteristics 

In the Tholen classification, Petropolitana is a stony S-type asteroid, which are more common in the inner than in the outer asteroid belt.

Rotation period 

In March 2005, a rotational lightcurve of Petropolitana was obtained from photometric observations by French amateur astronomer Pierre Antonini. Lightcurve analysis gave a rotation period of  hours with a brightness variation of  magnitude.

In 2016, a modeled lightcurve gave a concurring sidereal period of  hours using data from a large collaboration of individual observers (such as above). The study also determined two spin axes of (217.0°, 36.0°) and (34.0°, 41.0°) in ecliptic coordinates (λ, β). In 2018, however, an international photometric survey, using archived photometric data from the Geneva Observatory as well from dedicated observations, modeled a far longer period of  hours with an amplitude of  magnitude. The survey uses combines convex lightcurve inversion with a non-convex algorithm (SAGE) to derive their periods.

Diameter and albedo 

The Collaborative Asteroid Lightcurve Link, adopts the results obtained by IRAS, that is an albedo of 0.2382 and a diameter of 41.22 kilometers based on an absolute magnitude of 9.10.

These timed observations are taken when the asteroid passes in front of a distant star.

References

External links 
 Lightcurve Database Query (LCDB), at www.minorplanet.info
 Dictionary of Minor Planet Names, Google books
 Asteroids and comets rotation curves, CdR – Geneva Observatory, Raoul Behrend
 Discovery Circumstances: Numbered Minor Planets (1)-(5000) – Minor Planet Center
 
 

000830
Discoveries by Grigory Neujmin
Named minor planets
000830
19160825